Igor Zonjić (born 16 October 1991) is a Serbian-born Montenegrin professional footballer who plays as a defender for Malaysia Super League club Sabah.

Club career
After playing in the youth teams of Partizan and Obilić, Zonjić started his professional career with Banat Zrenjanin in the 2009–10 season. He made 76 appearances and scored three goals in the Serbian First League during his three-year tenure at the club.

On 30 July 2012, Zonjić signed a four-year contract with Partizan, but was immediately loaned to Teleoptik. He made 27 appearances and scored one goal for the Opticians during the 2012–13 Serbian First League.

International career
Although born in Serbia, Zonjić represented Montenegro at Under-19 and Under-21 level.

Honours
Mladost
Serbian First League: 2013–14

Career statistics

Honours
Mladost Lučani
Serbian First League: 2013–14
Napredak Kruševac
Serbian First League: 2015–16

Notes and references

External links
 
 Srbijafudbal profile

1991 births
Footballers from Belgrade
Serbian people of Montenegrin descent
Living people
Serbian footballers
Montenegrin footballers
Montenegro youth international footballers
Montenegro under-21 international footballers
Association football central defenders
FK Banat Zrenjanin players
FK Teleoptik players
FK Sinđelić Beograd players
FK Mladost Lučani players
FK Napredak Kruševac players
FK Bežanija players
FK Sutjeska Nikšić players
FK Rad players
Terengganu FC players
FC AGMK players
ACS Foresta Suceava players
Liga III players
Serbian First League players
Serbian SuperLiga players
Montenegrin First League players
Malaysia Super League players
Uzbekistan Super League players
Armenian First League players
Montenegrin expatriate footballers
Expatriate footballers in Malaysia
Montenegrin expatriate sportspeople in Malaysia
Expatriate footballers in Uzbekistan
Montenegrin expatriate sportspeople in Uzbekistan
Expatriate footballers in Armenia
Montenegrin expatriate sportspeople in Armenia
Expatriate footballers in Romania
Montenegrin expatriate sportspeople in Romania